In 1989 the U.S. Government enacted the Nevada Wilderness Bill, expanding the one existing Wilderness Area (Jarbidge) and creating thirteen new areas.

The following Wilderness Areas were expanded or designated in the Humboldt National Forest:

This area protects wilderness in the higher elevations of the Jarbidge Mountains in far northern Elko County.

The following Wilderness Areas were designated in the Toiyabe National Forest:

Additional areas are under consideration for designation as Wilderness Areas - for more information link to the Nevada Wilderness site listed below.

There are 16 official wilderness areas in Lincoln County that are part of the National Wilderness Preservation System. All are managed by the Bureau of Land Management. Several extend into neighboring counties (as indicated below).

Big Rocks Wilderness
Clover Mountains Wilderness
Delamar Mountains Wilderness
Far South Egans Wilderness (partly in Nye County, NV)
Fortification Range Wilderness
Meadow Valley Range Wilderness (partly in Clark County, NV)
Mormon Mountains Wilderness (partly in Clark County, NV)
Mount Grafton Wilderness (mostly in White Pine County, NV)
Mount Irish Wilderness
Parsnip Peak Wilderness
South Egan Range Wilderness (partly in White Pine County, NV; Nye County, NV)
South Pahroc Range Wilderness
Tunnel Spring Wilderness
Weepah Spring Wilderness (partly in Nye County, NV)
White Rock Range Wilderness
Worthington Mountains Wilderness

White Pine County is home to a number of designated wilderness areas.  They were created on December 20, 2006, by the "White Pine County Conservation, Recreation, and Development Act of 2006." About half are integral parts of Humboldt National Forest. The rest are managed by the Bureau of Land Management. One is shared between the two agencies. Some extend into neighboring counties, as indicated.

Bald Mountain Wilderness (Humboldt NF)
Becky Peak Wilderness (BLM)
Bristlecone Wilderness (BLM)
Goshute Canyon Wilderness (BLM)
Government Peak Wilderness (BLM)
High Schells Wilderness (Humboldt NF)
Highland Ridge Wilderness (BLM)
Mount Grafton Wilderness (BLM) partly in Lincoln County, NV
Mount Moriah Wilderness (Humboldt NF / BLM)
Red Mountain Wilderness (Humboldt NF) partly in Nye County, NV
Shellback Wilderness (Humboldt NF)
South Egan Range Wilderness (BLM) partly in Lincoln County, NV; Nye County, NV
White Pine Range Wilderness (Humboldt NF)

References

External links
 NevadaWilderness.org
 Nevada Wilderness Protection Act